James Edward Quigley (October 15, 1854 – July 10, 1915) was a Canadian-born prelate of the Catholic Church. He served as bishop of the Diocese of Buffalo in New York (1897–1903) and archbishop of the Archdiocese of Chicago in Illinois (1903–1915).

Biography

Early life and education
James Quigley was born on October 15, 1854, in Oshawa, Ontario, the son of James and Mary Lacey Quigley. His family immigrated to the United States when Quigley was age two, settling in Lima, New York. At age ten, he was sent to live with his uncle, Father Edward Quigley, the rector of Immaculate Conception Parish in Buffalo, New York.  As a young man, James Quigley worked as a dock worker in Buffalo.

After graduating from St. Joseph's College in Buffalo in 1872, Quigley passed an entrance examination for the United States Military Academy in West Point, New York.  However, he soon decided to enter the priesthood instead. Quigley attended Our Lady of Angels Seminary at Niagara Falls, New York.  He then went to Europe to study at the  University of Innsbruck in Austria and College of Propaganda in Rome.

Ordination and ministry
While in Rome, Quigley was ordained a priest for the Diocese of Buffalo on April 13, 1879. Following his return to New York, he was assigned as pastor of St. Vincent's Parish in Attica, New York.  He left St. Vincent's in 1884 to become rector of St. Joseph's Cathedral Parish in Buffalo. He was transferred to St. Bridget's Parish in Buffalo in 1886. Quigley preached in Latin, English, Italian and German. He was also conversant in French and Polish. He served for twelve years as the president of the Catholic Schools Board in Buffalo.

Bishop of Buffalo
On December 12, 1896, Pope Leo XIII appointed Quigley as bishop of the Diocese of  Buffalo.  He was consecrated on February 24, 1897, by Archbishop Michael Corrigan.

In 1899, the Longshoremen's Union, representing 1500 men who scooped grain out of grain ships, went on strike against the Lake Carriers Association.  The Association paid these men through saloon keepers, who would subtract charges for room, board and drinks from the workers' wages, leaving them very little.  When the saloon keepers raised their fees, the workers went on strike.  Quigley opened St. Bridget Church for the strikers, gave them strategic support, and acted as a mediator.  The strike finally ended when the carriers agreed to pay their workers directly and not through the saloon keepers.

In 1902, Quigley embarked on a public campaign against what he termed "socialism" in labor unions in Buffalo.  He claimed that Catholic workers felt that some union regulations were unjust and oppressive. Quigley wrote a pastoral letter in German to be read in ethnic German parishes that called on union members to assert their rights regarding union governance. He also spoke at mass meetings.  While claiming to support the union movement, Quigley denounced socialism and gave his interpretation of what the Catholic Church opposed it. As a result of his anti-socialism campaign in Buffalo, Quigley gained a national reputation.

Archbishop of Chicago
Quigley was appointed archbishop of the Archdiocese of Chicago on January 8, 1903, and installed on March 10, 1903. With Quigley's help, in 1905, then Reverend Francis Kelley established the Catholic Extension Society to provide funding and resources to dioceses and parishes. Quigley supported the establishment of ethnic parishes to address the needs of its newly arrived residents. In 1905, Quigley asked Father John De Schryver, SJ., a professor at St. Ignatius College Prep, to organize a parish for Belgian Catholics; St. John Berchmans Parish at Logan Square was established. Quigley established other parishes  for the Italian and Lithuanian communities. "Chicago's urban parishes flourished as an important spiritual, cultural, and educational component of Chicago's life."

In December 1910, Quigley approached Rev. Francis X. McCabe, president of DePaul University regarding the lack of opportunity for women to pursue higher learning in Catholic institutions. DePaul began admitting women the following year. In June 1912, Sister Mary Clemenza and Sister Mary Teresita became the first female graduates of DePaul.

Death and legacy 
In June 1915, in declining health, Quigley traveled to Rochester, New York, to stay with his brother while he was getting medical treatment.  James Quigley died in Rochester from what was called paralysis on July 10, 1915, at age 60.

In a resolution passed by the Chicago City Council, Quigley was recognized as"...one of those men who work quietly and behind the scenes, and who seek no public credit or applause for the work which they do; ...he spent himself...in particular in the service of the many and varied works of charity which have been founded..."The Quigley Center in Chicago is named in his honor.

References

1854 births
1915 deaths
19th-century Roman Catholic bishops in the United States
20th-century Roman Catholic archbishops in the United States
American Roman Catholic clergy of Irish descent
Roman Catholic archbishops of Chicago
Burials at the Bishop's Mausoleum, Mount Carmel Cemetery (Hillside)
Pre-Confederation Canadian emigrants to the United States
Clergy from Chicago
Roman Catholic bishops of Buffalo
St. Joseph's Collegiate Institute alumni
University of Innsbruck alumni